America Song is a live television series which aired on NBC during prime time, premiering on April 21, 1948, and ending on April 25, 1949.

Hosted by Paul Arnold, the program presented performances of United States folk music with Nellie Fisher (who also choreographed dances) and Ray Harrison as featured dancers. Each episode was 20 minutes long.

America Song aired on NBC at 7:30 p.m. ET, followed by Camel Newsreel Theatre. It was produced by Fred Coe and directed by Ira Skutch.

In its final four months, the program's title was American Songs.

A review of the June 16, 1948, episode in the trade publication Billboard described America Song as "a simple, unassuming television program, but one which is completely satisfying".

Preservation status
 
America Song is one of many TV series aired during the late 1940s for which little information is known, and it is unclear if any episodes survive of the program. Music TV programs were common during the 1940s and 1950s.

See also
1948-49 United States network television schedule

References

External links
 America Song at IMDB

1948 American television series debuts
1949 American television series endings
NBC original programming
English-language television shows
American live television series
Black-and-white American television shows